Tenmile Creek is a stream in Lane County, in the U.S. state of Oregon.

Tenmile Ridge, which runs parallel to and north of the stream, is named for the creek.

Tenmile Creek Bridge carries U.S. Highway 101 over the creek. Bridge engineer Conde B. McCullough designed the -long structure in 1931.

Ten Mile County Park, operated by Lane County, is along the stream. Amenities include toilets and four tent sites, with access to fishing and hunting.

Named tributaries from source to mouth are Wildcat Creek, which enters from the right; South Fork from the left; McKinney Creek from the right, and Mill Creek from the left.

See also
 List of rivers of Oregon

References

Rivers of Lane County, Oregon
Rivers of Oregon